Deep Elm Records is an independent record label releasing albums by bands such as Lights & Motion, The Appleseed Cast, Brandtson, The White Octave, and Planes Mistaken for Stars. It also released the compilation series The Emo Diaries.

History
Deep Elm Records started in New York City by John Szuch. Deep Elm's first release was the single "Anthemic Tune" by Curdlefur in 1995. Its first album was by Camber in March 1997.

In 2006, Deep Elm Records signed its first UK act, Free Diamonds. By 2008, Deep Elm stopped pressing physical CDs and vinyl, effectively becoming a digital only label. The label has refused to be bought out by a larger company, and is currently located in Maui, Hawaii.

Vice described Deep Elm as "a seminal label for the 90s/early 2000s emo scene".

Compilation albums 
Between 1997 and 2007, the label released a series of twelve compilation albums titled The Emo Diaries. The series had an open submissions policy and featured mostly acts that were unsigned at the time of the albums' releases. The Emo Diaries featured then-new and unreleased music by such acts as The Appleseed Cast, Brandtson, Further Seems Forever, Jimmy Eat World, Planes Mistaken for Stars and Samiam. It also released a compilation series called This Is Indie Rock.

Deep Elm's founder, John Szuch, claims that the original name for the series was intended to be The Indie Rock Diaries, but this was ruled out when the first volume included Jimmy Eat World and Samiam, who were both signed to major record labels. The Emo Diaries was chosen because The Emotional Diaries was too long for the album cover. Despite the title, the bands featured in the series have a diversity of sounds that do not all necessarily fit into the emo style of rock music. Andy Greenwald, in his book Nothing Feels Good: Punk Rock, Teenagers, and Emo, claims that the series "stake[s] a claim for emo as more a shared aesthetic than a genre." The label is now famous as a home for alternative post-rock bands, with acts such as Lights & Motion, Moonlit Sailor, Athletics and Dorena.

Artists past and present

500 Miles to Memphis
Accents
Again for the Win
The Appleseed Cast
Athletics
Benton Falls
Brandtson
Burns Out Bright
Camber
Cari Clara
Carly Comando
The Cast Before the Break
Clair De Lune
Cross My Heart
Dartz!
The Dandelion War
David Singer & the Sweet Science
Dead Red Sea
Desert City Soundtrack
Desoto Jones
Drive Til Morning
Eleven Minutes Away
Fightstar
Fire Divine
Five Eight
Flanders
Floating In Space
Free Diamonds
Ghost of Otis
Goonies Never Say Die
Hundred Hands
I Am Sonic Rain
Imbroco
Inward Oceans 
Keystone Kids
Kid You Not
Last Days of April
Last Lungs
Latterman
Les Sages
Lewis
Lock and Key
Lights & Motion
Logh
Moving Mountains
Moonlit Sailor
Muckafurgason
Our Lost Infantry
Papermoons
Pave the Rocket
Planes Mistaken for Stars
Pop Unknown
Public Radio
Red Animal War
Ride Your Bike
Settlefish
Seven Storey Mountain
She Bears
Slowride
Small Arms Dealer
So Sad Althea
Sounds Like Violence
Starmarket
Summer Hours
Surrounded
This Beautiful Mess
Track a Tiger
Triple Fast Action
U137
Walt Mink
The White Octave

Release history
Source: Deep Elm catalogue

Catalog no. - "Title" by artist

350 - Anthemic Tune by Candlefur
351 - On the Rug by Muler
352 - Pressure Free by Nada Surf
353 - Choice by Velour
354 - My Danger by Shake Appeal
355 - Superhighway by Fifty Feet Tall
356 - Plague Dogs by Scout
357 - Braniac by Ruth Ruth
358 - Hallowed-Out by Camber
359 - Beautiful Charade by Camber 
360 - The Little Death by Ruth Ruth
361 - Colossus by Walt Mink
362 - What's Mine Is Yours (The Emo Diaries 1, 1997)
363 - Tossing a Friend by Muckafurgason
364 - Taken in by Pave the Rocket
365 - Taken in by Pave the Rocket
366 - Letter Box by Brandtson
367 - A Million Miles Away (Emo Diaries 2,1998)
368 - Goodnite by Walt Mink
369 - Deep Elm Sampler No. 1: Records for the Working Class by V/A
370 - The End of the Ring Wars by Appleseed Cast
371 - Summer Season Kills by Pop Unknown
372 - Self-Titled by Cross My Heart
373 - The Moment of Truth (Emo Diaries 3, 1999)
374 - Calendar by Starmarket
375 - Anyway, I've Been There by  Camber 
376 - The Gay EP by Muckafurgason
377 - Self-titled by Planes Mistaken for Stars
378 - 3-Way Split by Appleseed Cast/PMFS/Race Car Riot
379 -  Based On A True Story by Seven Storey Mountain
380 - Fallen Star Collection by Brandtson
381 - An Ocean of Doubt (Emo Diaries 4, 1999)
382 - If Arsenic Fails, Try Algebra by Pop Unknown
383 - Knife in the Marathon by Planes Mistaken for Stars
384 - The Good Nurse by Five Eight
385 - Deep Elm Sampler No. 2: Records for the Working Class II by V/A
386 - Mare Vitalis by Appleseed Cast (2000)
387 - Are You My Lionkiller? by Imbroco
388 - Four Hours Light by Starmarket
389 - Temporary Contemporary by Cross My Heart
390 - I Guess This Is Goodbye (Emo Diaries 5, 2000)
391 - Birds by Dead Red Sea
392 - Trying to Figure Each Other Out by Brandtson
393 - Little Eyes by Hundred Hands
394 - Dividing By Zero by Seven Storey
395 - Breaking an Angel by Red Animal War
396 - Low Level Owl: Volume I by Appleseed Cast (2000)
397 - Low Level Owl: Volume II by Appleseed Cast (2000)
398 - The Cost of Living by David Singer
399 - Fighting Starlight by Benton Falls
400 - Deep Elm Sampler No. 3: Sound Spirit Fury Fire by V/A
401 - Angel Youth by Last Days of April
402 - Deep Elm Unreleased No. 1 by V/A
403 - The Silence in My Heart (Emo Diaries 6, 2001)
404 - Emo is Awesome / Emo is Evil 2 by V/A
405 - Wake Up and Be Happy by Camber 
406 - As I Survive the Suicide Bomber by Slowride
407 - Me Against the World (Emo Diaries 7, 2002)
408 - Dial in Sounds by Brandtson
409 - Falling on Deaf Ears by This Beautiful Mess
410 - Even So by Lewis
411 - Deep Elm Unreleased No. 2 by V/A
412 - Self-Titled by Slowride / Red Animal War
413 - Self-Titled by Drive Til Morning
414 - Building a Building by Slowride
415 - Deep Elm Sampler No. 4: Hearts Bleed Blue by V/A
416 - Death & Taxes by Brandtson
417 - My Very Last Breath (Emo Diaries 8, 2002)
418 - Every Time a Bell Rings an Angel Gets His Wings by Logh
419 - Black Phantom Crusades by Red Animal War
420 - Lost Songs by Appleseed Cast (2002)
421 - Civil Wars by David Singer
422 - Guilt Beats Hate by Benton Falls
423 - Dance a While, Upset by Settlefish
424 - Sad Songs Remind Me (Emo Diaries 9, 2003)
425 -  Contents of Distraction by Desert City Soundtrack
426 - Self-Titled by Brandtson / Camber / Seven Storey
427 - Too Young to Die by V/A
428 - Safety in Numbers by Surrounded
429 - The Pistol by Sounds Like Violence
430 - Deep Elm Sampler No. 5: This Is How I Kill My Tears by V/A
431 - Funeral Car by Desert City Soundtrack
432 - The Hope I Hide Inside (Emo Diaries 10, 2004) by V/A
433 - Distance and Darkness by Burns Out Bright
434 - It's All a Blur by Fire Divine
435 - No Fate by Lock and Key
436 - Arson Followed Me Home by Eleven Minutes Away
437 - Self-Titled by Sounds Like Violence / Desert City Soundtrack / Settlefish
438 - Marionettes by Clair De Lune
439 - This is Indie Rock, Vol. 1 by V/A
440 - Pull Up the Floorboards by Lock and Key
441 - The Plural of the Choir by Settlefish
442 - No Matter Where We Go...! by Latterman
443 - Turn Up the Punk, We'll Be Singing by Latterman
444 - Perfect Addiction by Desert City Soundtrack
445 - Deep Elm Sampler No. 6: The New Crazy by V/A
446 - This Is Indie Rock, Vol. 2 by V/A
447 - Save Yourself a Lifetime by Burns Out Bright
448 - C / S by Slowride
449 - This Is Indie Rock, Vol. 3 by V/A
450 - Cover Your Tracks by V/A
451 - A Single Unifying Theory by Small Arms Dealer
452 - There Should Be More Dancing by Free Diamonds
453 - They Liked You Better When You Were Dead by Fightstar
454 - We Are Still Alive by Latterman
455 - With Blood On My Hands by Sounds Like Violence
456 - Assisted Living by Clair De Lune
457 - Forty-Fives by V/A
458 - Deep Elm Unreleased No. 3 by V/A
459 - Deep Elm Unreleased No. 4 by V/A
460 - Deep Elm Sampler No. 7: Defending The Kingdom by V/A
461 - We Moved Like Ghosts by Track a Tiger
462 - Patron Saint Of Disappointment by Small Arms Dealer
463 - By the Sword by Free Diamonds
464 - Sunshine in a Shotglass by 500 Miles to Memphis
465 - Taking Back What's Ours (Emo Diaries 11, 2007) by V/A
466 - This Is My Ship by Dartz!
467 - The Quiet Choir by Settlefish
468 - Bad News From the Bar by Ride Your Bike
469 - Deep Elm Unreleased No. 5 by V/A
470 - Aurora by Desoto Jones
471 - Pneuma by Moving Mountains
472 - Deep Elm Sampler No. 8: Bonfire Of Trust by V/A
473 - No More Sadness, No More Lies by So Sad Althea
474 - Urgency Factor by Flanders
475 - Everyday by Carly Comando
476 - The Troubleshooting Is Over by Desoto Jones
477 - Stay Awake Stay Alive by Desoto Jones
478 - Sweet Child by Public Radio
479 - Self-Titled by Ryan Malott & Kelly Thomas
480 - I Felt The Bullet Hit My Heart by Track a Tiger
481 - San Diego XIII by This Drama
482 - The Fear by Nathan Xander
483 - In a Forest Without Trees by Goonies Never Say Die
484 - Give & Take by Late Night Condition
485 - It's Our Hearts They're After by Cari Clara
486 - Woke Up Early the Day I Died by Track a Tiger
487 - New Tales by Papermoons
488 - So Close to Life by Moonlit Sailor
489 - A Footprint of Feelings by Moonlit Sailor
490 - Deep Elm Sampler No. 9: We Dream Alone by Various Artists
491 - Miniature American Model Society by Cari Clara
492 - You Better Run by Cari Clara
493 - Prisms by Down To Earth
494 - Room for the Three of Us by Down To Earth
495 - It's Fun to Do Bad Things by Lions Rampant
496 - Play Rock N Roll by Lions Rampant
497 - Half Women Half Alcohol by Lions Rampant
498 - Midnight Confessions by Late Night Condition
499 - Bullfighter by Slowride
500 - I Found Myself Asleep by She Bears
501 - The Connection by Ride Your Bike
502 - The Pink Album by Muckafurgason
503 - Share This by Les Sages
504 - Animals by Les Sages
505 - Paul / Sink Jacinto? by Goonies Never Say Die
506 - Tarantula Mata by This Drama
507 - Holofon by Dorena
508 - About Everything and More by Dorena
509 - Look at That Old Grizzly Bear by Last Lungs
510 - One Take by Carly Comando
511 - Cordelia by Carly Comando
512 - It's Falling on Us by I Am Sonic Rain
513 - Between Whales and Feverish Lights by I Am Sonic Rain
514 - Dimes & Discourses by Sky Life
515 - Roots and Wings by Sky Life
516 - John Wayne / Darkness by Nathan Xander
517 - Inside Out by Summer Hours
518 - Alone Together by Summer Hours
519 - No Words to Voice Our Hopes and Fears by Goonies Never Say Die
520 - Why Aren't I Home? by Athletics
521 - Ashes and Lies by Benton Falls
522 - I Love You But in the End I Will Destroy You (Emo Diaries 12, 2011) by V/A
523 - Deep Elm Sampler No. 10: The World Won't Spin Forever by V/A
524 - Dreamweaver by Christoffer Franzén (of Lights & Motion)
525 - We've Built Up to Nothing by 500 Miles to Memphis
526 - As Your Shoulders Turn on You by Cast Before The Break
527 - Still by Cast Before the Break
528 - The Old and the New World by Ethienne
529 - Hopes and Denials by Ghost of Otis
530 - Postrockology by V/A
531 - Colors in Stereo by Moonlit Sailor
532 - Goddverb by Coma Recovery
533 - Five and Nine by Last Lungs
534 - Low Level Owl: Volumes 1 + 2 by Appleseed Cast
535 - Floating: The Nathan Gocke Story by V/A
536 - Things Get Shaky by Keystone Kids
537 - Growth and Squalor by Accents
538 - Stop Torturing Yourself by Athletics
539 - Midnight March by Cari Clara
540 - We've Been Here Forever by Again for the Win
541 - We Were Always Loyal to Lost Causes by The Dandelion War
542 - Everyday 2.0 by Carly Comando
543 - Caves by Sky Life
544 - The New Art History by Our Lost Infantry
545 - Deep Elm Sampler No. 11: I Am The Danger by V/A
546 - Reanimation by Lights & Motion
547 - The Wasted Youth by This Drama
548 - Blood Harmony by Les Sages
549 - Nuet by Dorena
550 - Save Your Heart by Lights & Motion
551 - Every Moment by Carly Comando
552 - Dreamer on the Run by U137
553 - No Love by Papermoons
554 - We Come From Exploding Stars by Moonlit Sailor
555 - Music for Film & Television, Vol. 1 by Christoffer Franzén (of Lights & Motion)
556 - Tall Tales by Accents
557 - Who You Are Is Not Enough by Athletics
558 - Deep Elm Sampler No. 12: Sometimes I See You in the Stars by V/A
559 - Music for Film & Television, Vol. 2 by Christoffer Franzén (of Lights & Motion)
560 - Chronicle (Lights & Motion album)|Chronicle by Lights & Motion
561 - Small Tales by Accents
562 - Vive Siempre by This Drama
563 - Dreamlife by Carly Comando
564 - Interregnum by Our Lost Infantry
565 - Paths From Home by Inward Oceans
566 - Russian Roulette by Sons of London
567 - Wide Awake by Christoffer Franzén (of Lights & Motion)
568 - Back on Track by Late Night Condition
569 - Deep Elm Sampler No. 13: This Heart of Mine by V/A
570 - The Edge of Light by Floating In Space
571 - Dear Avalanche by Lights & Motion
572 - Taking Flight by Christoffer Franzén (of Lights & Motion)
573 - Phenomenon by Christoffer Franzén (of Lights & Motion)
574 - Weather the Storm by Inward Oceans
575 - We Only Have Forever (Quiet) by Lights & Motion
576 - Never a Dull Movement by Kid You Not
577 - Everyday (Grand Piano) by Carly Comando
578 - Adam Forever / The Great Leap by U137
579 - Hidden by I Am Sonic Rain
580 - Bloom by Lights & Motion
581 - Dreamland by Floating In Space
582 - At the End of the Day (Original Score) by Christoffer Franzén (of Lights & Motion)
583 - Apotheosis by Coma Recovery
584 - A Flickering Start by Lights & Motion
585 - Home Again by Kid You Not
586 - We Are Infinite (Single) by Lights & Motion
587 - While We Dream by Lights & Motion
588 - Forever Is About to Happen by Christoffer Franzén (of Lights & Motion)
589 - Ocean Floor by Christoffer Franzén (of Lights & Motion)
590 - Kaleidoscope by Christoffer Franzén (of Lights & Motion)
591 - In I Dimman (Original Motion Picture Soundtrack) by Christoffer Franzén (of Lights & Motion)
592 - What We Call Home by U137
593 - Chapter Two by U137
594 - Mountain by Christoffer Franzén (of Lights & Motion)
595 - Echoes by Everything In Waves
596 - Sempre Piu by Wlots
597 - Clarity (Triple Single) by Carly Comando
598 - Epic by Carly Comando
599 - Vultures by Lights & Motion

References

External links

Companies based in Charlotte, North Carolina
American independent record labels
Indie rock record labels
Alternative rock record labels